"Pillow Fight" is a song by Swedish electronic music duo Galantis. Written by Ross Golan, Galantis, Jimmy Koitzsch and Henrik Jonback, with production handled by the latter three, it was released on 15 December 2016 via Atlantic and WMG.

Background 
The track was first unveiled during Galantis' performance in San Jose, as part of their California College tour.

"In lots of ways 'Pillow Fight' brings back the original Galantis heart and roots, and reminds us why we started this project," Galantis said in a press release. "Launch yourself in every wave, live and breathe the full-throttle mentality, we'll go to sleep tomorrow."

On 13 January, they released a VIP mix of the track with American DJ and producer CID.

Track listing

Charts

Release history

References 

2016 songs
2016 singles
Galantis songs
Atlantic Records singles
Warner Music Group singles
Songs written by Ross Golan
Songs written by Henrik Jonback
Songs written by Christian Karlsson (DJ)
Songs written by Style of Eye
Song recordings produced by Henrik Jonback
Songs written by Svidden